Rosa Leveroni i Valls (1910–1985) was a Catalan poet and narrator. Born in Barcelona, she was influenced by the poet Carles Riba. Her work is published in Poesia (1981) and Contes (1981). She also wrote essays and literary criticism. She spent time revitalising Catalan language and culture in the post World War II years. She was awarded the Creu de Sant Jordi in 1982. She was one of the first members of the Associació d'Escriptors en Llengua Catalana. She died in Cadaqués in 1985.

Works

Poetry 
 Epigrames i cançons (1938) 
 Presència i record (1952)
 Poesia (1981)

Essays and literary criticism 
 Les imatges marines en la poesia d'Ausiàs March (1951)
 Maria Novell, recordada (1969)
 Un epistolari de Carles Riba (1940-42)

Short texts 
 Contes (1986)
 L'estranger, L'Horta, Retorn (in several anthologies)
 Un home de lletres i altres contes (Horsori Editorial, Barcelona, 2011)

References

External links
 

1910 births
1985 deaths
People from Barcelona
Spanish women poets
20th-century Spanish women writers
20th-century Spanish poets